Calling Festival (formerly Hyde Park Calling and Hard Rock Calling) was an annual music festival, formerly held in Hyde Park, London, from 2006 until 2012, and from 2013 in Queen Elizabeth Olympic Park, London. In September 2013, Hard Rock International announced that they would no longer be sponsoring the festival; however the event returned in 2014 and 2015 under the name Calling Festival at the Clapham Common.

The music played is primarily rock music, and various performers, including The Killers, Paul McCartney, Eric Clapton, The Who, Bon Jovi, Roger Waters (with Nick Mason), The Police, Aerosmith, Neil Young and Bruce Springsteen have played at the event. The festival was organised by Hard Rock Cafe and Live Nation.

Hyde Park Calling 2006
The inaugural festival had two stages and was headlined by Roger Waters (performing in its entirety the Pink Floyd album The Dark Side of the Moon as part of his set) and his band (featuring Pink Floyd drummer Nick Mason) on the Saturday and The Who on the Sunday. Gates opened at 14:00, and the show ended at 22:15 on both evenings. The Who's Sunday headline performance was released as part of their Encore Series 2006 of CDs & DVDs. British TV Show Top Gear filmed a brief segment of The Who’s concert as part of a Van review between the three hosts.

The festival was a peaceful one, being inside the city the event required attendees to rely on external accommodation - unlike more popular festivals such as Download Festival or Reading and Leeds Festival, which require camping on site for most people.

Despite the veteran status of the headline acts, most other bands were younger and with a more 'contemporary' audience, providing a contrast in musical styles. Since this festival, Razorlight particularly has acquired much fame and in under a year has gone from second slot in a smaller inaugural event like Hyde Park Calling to headlining the long-running and respected Reading/Leeds Festival. The festival mainstage proved to be unusually British, with the British Isles being represented by seven English bands and two Scottish, with only one American and one New Zealand band from abroad. However of the ten second stage bands, three were from Canada and two from the USA.

Hyde Park Calling 2007 
After Hyde Park Calling's success, a Hyde Park Calling 2007 quickly entered planning stages. It was announced that the event would take place during the weekend of 23–24 June 2007. It was Aerosmith's first concert in the United Kingdom for 8 years and featured Peter Gabriel and the recently reformed Crowded House as a joint-headliner for the first day. Other draws to this year's event were the addition of a new third stage. Only one band to have played at the previous Hyde Park Calling, Rose Hill Drive, played again in 2007. With six bands per stage, instead of five, and an extra stage, the expansion of the festival only a year after its inception was dramatic.

One of the many incarnations of the Buena Vista Social Club featured. Hyde Park Calling 2007's version of the band includes Manuel "Guajiro" Mirabal (trumpet), Orlando "Cachaito" López (double bass), Manuel Galbán (guitar) and Jesus "Aguaje" Ramos (trumpet). Unlike the previous years' mostly British mainstage, of the nine bands playing, three were American, one from New Zealand and one from Australia.

Sunday became an "Aerosmith Family" event. Aerosmith headlined the mainstage, with it opened by The Micki Free Electric Blues then Arckid - a band featuring Steve Tyler (vocalist of Aerosmith)'s son in law. Chris Cornell played the main stage before Aerosmith made their appearance. TAB the Band, played fourth on the bill on second stage featuring Aerosmith guitarist Joe Perry's two sons. Many people saw the event as unbalanced, with most commercially successful bands playing the Sunday (Aerosmith in particular - having sold more albums than both of Saturday's headline bands combined). The second stage was sponsored by Pepsi.

Despite Aerosmith having the headline slot on Sunday, Chris Cornell played for the same length of time. His set combined Audioslave and Soundgarden songs with his own. In keeping with the family theme Aerosmith brought with them, on Saturday Peter Gabriel's daughter sang and played percussion. On Sunday Cornell brought his two children onto the stage for the audience to see.

Aerosmith had to finish at 10.30 pm due to the curfew, and the police were forcing them to leave. The encore was the usual Walk this Way song, but featured Darryl McDaniels (commonly referred to simply as 'DMC'). This was the first time a member of Run-D.M.C. had performed with Aerosmith since their 2002 tour, five years previous.

Hard Rock Calling 2008 
In late December 2007, the Hyde Park Calling 2008 website was launched. It confirmed the dates for 28–29 June 2008.

On 28 January 2008, the headliners for each day were announced, along with 2 support acts for each day:

Hard Rock Calling 2009 
In 2009, for the first time it was a three-day event, beginning on the Friday rather than a Saturday, running over 26, 27 and 28 June. Neil Young headlined on Saturday and his encore was a cover version of "A Day in the Life" by the Beatles. Paul McCartney joined him on stage for parts of this performance. Bruce Springsteen finished his headlining set with "Dancing in the Dark", while he also joined The Gaslight Anthem for their song "The '59 Sound". Springsteen's entire set was released on DVD in June 2010, titled London Calling: Live in Hyde Park.

Hard Rock Calling 2010 

Hard Rock Calling 2010 took place of the weekend beginning 25 June. Wolfmother was scheduled to perform on Friday but backed out in advance.

Hard Rock Calling 2011

The 2011 festival took place over the weekend of 24–26 June.

Hard Rock Calling 2012

During the song "Twist and Shout", performed by Bruce Springsteen and guest Paul McCartney at the Saturday show, Springsteen was forced to cut his set short when he ran overtime on a council curfew. Paul Simon's set featured Hugh Masekela, Ladysmith Black Mambazo and Jimmy Cliff; it was released on DVD and album in June 2017, titled The Concert in Hyde Park.

"I don't recall anything of Hyde Park," Soundgarden bassist Ben Shepherd said in 2013, "except looking stage-right and seeing that Jimmy Page was watching us. So, if anything, we actually played a lot more professionally than we usually do. I thought we were spot-on."

Hard Rock Calling 2013

The 2013 event was moved to the Queen Elizabeth Olympic Park in Stratford after Live Nation had pulled out of the tender for Hyde Park. The 2013 festival returned to being a two-day event, unlike the four previous years which had run over three consecutive days. The first announcement was made on 5 March, when Kasabian and Bruce Springsteen & The E Street Band were confirmed as headliners. It would be the latter's second headline performance in consecutive years.

Calling Festival 2014
Hard Rock Calling returned under the name of Calling Festival from 28 to 29 June 2014 at Clapham Common. It was renamed Calling Festival when the previous sponsor, Hard Rock International, pulled out.

Calling Festival 2015
Calling Festival returned to Clapham Common the following year, but only as a one-day festival, on 4 July.

References

External links
 Hard Rock Calling Official Website
 Exclusive online outlet for CD/DVD of The Who's set from Hyde Park Calling 2006
 Hyde Park Calling at eFestivals

Music festivals in London
Culture in London
Recurring events established in 2006
2006 establishments in England